The 2022 New Zealand Men's National League is the second scheduled season of the National League since its restructuring in 2021; the 2021 National League was cancelled due to the COVID-19 pandemic in northern regions. 32 clubs compete in the competition, with four qualifying from the Northern League, three qualifying from the Central League and two qualifying from the Southern League for the National Championship phase.
Each team can field a maximum of four foreign players as well as one additional foreign player who has Oceania Football Confederation nationality. Each team must also have at least two players aged 20 or under in the starting eleven.

This season the Wellington Phoenix Reserves replaced Lower Hutt City and was allowed to play in the Central League though they still have an automatic entry into the  Championship phase. The Southern League also increased by two teams to have ten, adding three new sides to the league.

Qualifying leagues

2022 Northern League

Northern League teams
Twelve teams are competing in the league – the top ten teams from the previous season and the two teams promoted from the 2021 NRFL Division 1. The promoted teams are Waiheke United and Takapuna. This is both Waiheke's and Takapuna's first season in the Northern League. They replaced Northern Rovers and West Coast Rangers (both teams relegated after their debut seasons in the Northern League).

Source:

Northern League personnel and kits

Northern League table

Northern League results table

Northern League scoring

Northern League top scorers

Northern League hat-tricks

Own goals

2022 Central League

Central League teams 
Ten teams are competing in the league – the top nine teams from the previous season and the one team promoted from the 2021 play-off between the winners of the Central Federation League and the Capital Premier. The winner of the play-off was Havelock North Wanderers. This is their first season in the Central League, since New Zealand football’s restructuring in 2021. They replaced Wainuiomata (relegated to the Capital Premier League). Wairarapa United was entered as one of the originally 10 teams to play the 2022 season but withdrew with just two weeks to go before the start of the season. They were replaced by Wellington United who had originally missed out on promotion to Havelock North Wanderers. Lower Hutt City was also replaced by Wellington Phoenix Reserves for the Central League games.

Central League personnel and kits

Central League table

Central League results table

Central League scoring

Central League top scorers

Central League hat-tricks

Own goals

2022 Southern League

Southern League teams 
Ten teams are competing in the league, two more than in the previous season. The top five Mainland teams and two FootballSouth teams remain from the previous season, and are joined by two teams promoted from the 2021 Mainland Premier League and one team promoted from the 2021 FootballSouth Premier League. The promoted teams from Mainland are Ferrymead Bays and Nomads United, and the promoted team from FootballSouth is Mosgiel. This is all three teams' first season in the Southern League. They replaced Otago University (relegated after the debut season of the Southern League).

Southern League personnel and kits

Southern League table

Southern League results table

Southern League scoring

Southern League top scorers

Southern League hat-tricks

Own goals

Qualified clubs
There are 10 men’s National League Championship qualifying spots (4 for the Northern League, 3 plus Wellington Phoenix Reserves for the Central League and 2 for the Southern League).

Championship phase

League table
Christchurch United won 4–1 in Round 9, but fielded an ineligible player. Result overturned to a 3–0 win for Cashmere Technical.

Results table

Positions by round
The table lists the positions of teams after each week of matches. To preserve chronological evolvements, any postponed matches are not included in the round at which they were originally scheduled, but added to the full round they were played immediately afterwards. For example, if a match is scheduled for round 3, but then postponed and played between rounds 6 and 7, it is added to the standings for round 6.

Grand Final

Statistics

Top scorers

Awards

Goal of the Week

Team of the Month

Annual awards

References

External links
 National League website 

New Zealand Football Championship
New Zealand Football Championship
2021–22 in New Zealand association football
New Zealand National League seasons